Callichroma omissum is a species of beetle in the family Cerambycidae. It was described by Schmidt in 1924. It is known from southeastern Brazil.

References

Callichromatini
Beetles described in 1924